Matteo Brida (1699-1744) was an Italian painter active mainly in his native Verona.

He trained under Padre Simbenati in Verona, who also trained Giovanni Battista Caregari Targa. Among the pupils or those influenced by Brida are Felice Boscaratti and Francesco Lorenzi. The painting restorer, Luca Brida, is thought to be his son.

He painted two prophets for the church of San Marco in San Girolamo in Vicenza.

References

1699 births
1744 deaths
Painters from Verona
18th-century Italian painters
Italian male painters
18th-century Italian male artists